Abrau-Durso is a Russian wine company located in the village of Abrau-Dyurso.

The winery was established in 1870 by decree of the Emperor of all the Russias Alexander II. It produces and sells sparkling wines, and also operates a hotel, spa, and restaurant. Abrau-Durso is described as owning one of the best wine regions in Russia, and belongs to Boris Titov.

References

External links
 Official website

Wineries of the Soviet Union
Wineries of Russia
Companies based in Krasnodar Krai
Companies listed on the Moscow Exchange
Russian brands